Lucky Thirteen is the 2007 debut studio album from Swedish singer Vincent Pontare, also known as Vincent. It was released through Little Stereo Recordings. All the songs were co-written by Vincent in collaboration with other songwriters. Three singles were released from the album.

Track listing

Charts

References

2007 debut albums
Vincent Pontare albums